Black Noise is the third studio album by German electronic music producer Pantha du Prince. It was released on 8 February 2010 by Rough Trade Records, serving as his first release on the label. The track "Stick to My Side" features a guest spot from Noah Lennox of Animal Collective, while Tyler Pope of LCD Soundsystem and !!! plays bass on "The Splendour".

Track listing

Charts

References

2010 albums
Pantha du Prince albums